Demonax (c. AD 70 – c. 170) was a Greek Cynic philosopher.

Demonax may also refer to:
Demonax (lawmaker) ( 550 BC), Arcadian lawmaker
Demonax (crater), lunar crater
Demonax (beetle), a genus of the longhorn beetles in the family Cerambycidae